Halton Vicarage is in Castle Road, Halton in the town of Runcorn, Cheshire, England.  It is recorded in the National Heritage List for England as a designated Grade II* listed building.

The vicarage was built in 1739 by Sir John Chesshyre for the incumbent of St Mary's Church. It is built in sandstone with a slate roof and has rusticated quoins.  It has five bays, the central of which is flanked by giant pilasters.  The porch is supported by Doric columns.  The eaves cornice has a solid parapet with a pedimented centre.  Over the door are Sir John's coat of arms.

See also

Grade I and II* listed buildings in Halton (borough)
Listed buildings in Runcorn (urban area)

References

Houses completed in 1739
Grade II* listed buildings in Cheshire
Buildings and structures in Runcorn
Clergy houses in England
Grade II* listed houses
1739 establishments in England
Georgian architecture in Cheshire